The RTÉ Television Centre is a television studio building which is owned by Ireland's national public service broadcaster Raidió Teilifís Éireann. It is part of the RTÉ campus located at Donnybrook in South Dublin. The building houses the main production studios for RTÉ Television, the control rooms for all RTÉ's TV channels, and RTÉ's main newsroom.

History
When plans for an Irish national television station were developed in the late 1950s attention quickly turned to a suitable location for the new television studios and adjoining offices.  By September 1959 a 25-acre area of land on the Stillorgan road 
in Donnybrook became the favoured site for the new television production centre.

On 3 October 1960 the new Radio Éireann Authority signed a £500,000 contract for the construction of the television centre and offices at the proposed location.  A few hours after this the contractors began to move in.  The contract was awarded to Messrs. E. Stone & Sons Ltd. from Thorncastle street in Dublin, one of four firms invited to tender. The building when completed in 1962 contained the first purpose-built television studios in Ireland, as existing studios in Belfast had been set up in converted buildings.

At the beginning of "The Troubles" in Northern Ireland  a bomb damaged the front of the building early on the morning of 5 August 1969. The Ulster Volunteer Force (UVF) claimed responsibility, this being the first bomb that they had ever planted in the Republic of Ireland. The bombing took place during the protest campaign by the Northern Ireland Civil Rights Association but before the 1969 riots.

The building

Design
The Television Centre, designed by the Scott-Tallon-Walker firm of architects in Dublin, is 30 feet high with the tops of the main studios rising a further 15 feet above the roof line. In all there are eight television studios in the building, four main production studios; 1,2,4,and 5, a news studio; 3, and three presentation studios; 6,7, and 8, as well as a small studio for radio news bulletins.

Studios
There were only three studios in the original building completed in 1962, however, since then a number of new studios and sound stages have been added to the existing complex.

From the early 1970s all the studios were gradually converted to colour operation starting with Studio 3, the news studio, and finishing with Studio 1 in 1976. Since January 2019 all of the studios have been upgraded to High Definition standard.

In the late 1970s RTÉ's schedule was increasing and expanding, especially with the launch of Ireland's second channel RTÉ 2 in November 1978. There was also a growing need for a new larger television studio, as Studio 1 was seen as being too small for many productions.

Studios 4 and 5 were constructed towards the end of the 1970s. Studio 4 measures , making it the largest purpose-built television studio in Ireland. From the early 1980s onwards it would be home to the majority of RTÉ's large audience based shows.

In 1995 Studio 4 was redeveloped to better cater for audiences, and a new permanent seating rostra was built into it that can accommodate audiences of up to 250. Today Studio 4 is one of the busiest studios in the Television Centre, accommodating The Late Late Show, The Ray D'Arcy Show and Prime Time all in one week.

As well as the studios the building also houses the control rooms for the various channels, MCR (Master Control Room), technical areas for video playout, edit suites, graphics area, scene dock, dressing rooms, green rooms, makeup area, wardrobe, a radio news studio, and RTÉ's main newsroom.

In an adjoining building there are also two sound stages which are used for dramas, soaps etc. such as RTÉ's flagship soap Fair City, and the award-winning drama Love/Hate. The sound stages are named A and B and both measure .

Studio 1

Completed in 1962, Studio 1 was originally the largest studio in the television centre and was originally designed for variety shows, dramas and musicals. The studio can comfortably accommodate an audience of 120. It is currently home to many of RTÉ's game shows, including Winning Streak and Know The Score.

Former programmes recorded or transmitted included:
{{columns-list|colwidth=30em|
Kenny Live
The Late Late Show
Insurrection
Eurofashion '68Tolka RowThe Dress DanceAn BullaíAn TriallHow Long is Kissing Time?The True Story of Red Riding HoodThe Last TroubadourNightlifeGoing into ExileThe Loves of Cass McGuireLady Windemere's FanAntigoneKillraggart 17National Song ContestHair Today, Gone TomorrowAimen HighThe LadsStrings in the AirSing a SongWhere in the World?Black BoxThe Gold Star AwardLegion of the RearguardSing a Christmas SongThe Lyrics BoardTo Tell the TruthConversations on a HomecomingFacets IrishThe Plough and the StarsThe Ante RoomMake Mine MusicCabaretStar TimeReach for the StarsYour Christmas PhilTeems of TimesLive AidSons and MothersLifelines}}

Studio 2

Studio 2, the second of the original studios, was designed for interviews, panel games and current affairs programmes.

Programmes recorded or transmitted included:

Studio 3

RTÉ's main television news bulletins are aired from Studio 3. The original studio was extended and equipped with unmanned robotic cameras in 2009. During December 2018 and January 2019 the studio was refurbished and upgraded to High Definition working to coincide with a relaunch of RTÉ News presentation on Monday 28 January 2019. The refurbishment of the studio and news presentation was part of a €1.7 million revamp.

Studio 4

The largest studio in the television centre, it can accommodate audiences of up to 250. This studio is home to programmes such as The Late Late Show, The Tommy Tiernan Show and Claire Byrne Live.

Studio 4 was completed in 1982 but did not enter full operation until 1986 when the popular weekday afternoon talk/entertainment show "Live at 3" was produced from the studio.

Studio 4 was completely overhauled and refurbished in the summer of 1995 which saw it gain a permanent audience rostra installed which could accommodate audiences of up to 250 if required.  The long running Late Late Show and other key audience based entertainment shows moved into Studio 4 from Autumn 1995.

Studio 5

Built in the late 1970s, Studio 5 was the first studio in the television centre to be upgraded to High Definition. Programmes broadcast from the studio include Prime Time, The Sunday Game, Soccer Republic, Against the Head'', as well as RTÉ's coverage of the FIFA World Cup, UEFA Champions League, UEFA European Championship and Six Nations Championship. Studio 5 was used as the main election studio for RTÉ's 2020 general election coverage in February 2020, supported by Studio 3 and the RTÉ Newsroom.

Studio 6

Studio 7

Studio 8

Stage A

Stage B

Green Screen Stage

Future development
In 2009, RTÉ announced its long-term plans for the redevelopment of the entire Donnybrook site including the Television Centre and the Radio Centre. The project envisages the gradual replacement over a 10- to 15-year period of most of the current 1960 and 1970s buildings on the Donnybrook site with a purpose-built modern building complex designed for the digital and high-definition age.

Gallery

References

Buildings and structures in Dublin (city)
Commercial buildings completed in 1961
Raidió Teilifís Éireann
Television studios
20th-century architecture in the Republic of Ireland